The Ferrari F50 GT (also known as the Ferrari F50 GT1) was a racing derivative of Ferrari F50, intended to compete in the BPR Global GT Series against other series rivals, such as the McLaren F1 GTR. After the series folded, Ferrari was unhappy with homologation specials such as the Porsche 911 GT1 being allowed in the newly formed FIA GT Championship and decided to cancel the project due to lack of funding to compete.
The car was co-developed with Dallara and Michelotto.

History

Following the motorsport theme of the Ferrari F40 LM, Ferrari developed the F50 GT, a prototype based on the F50 that was built to compete in GT1-class racing. The car had a fixed roof, a large rear wing, new front spoiler and many other adjustments. A test held in 1996 proved the car to be quicker even than the 333 SP, but this went unnoticed as Ferrari cancelled the F50 GT project because it was unhappy with FIA allowing homologation special cars such as the Porsche 911 GT1 in the series. Ferrari instead focused on Formula One after the BPR Global GT Series folded. The company sold off the three complete chassis out of the six planned chassis that were built–the test car 001, 002 and 003. Chassis 002 and 003 had bodies fitted before being sold. The remaining three tubs were reportedly destroyed.

Performance 
 Torque:  at 7,500 rpm
 Power-to-weight ratio: 0.872 PS/kg or 872.093 PS per tonne or 1.1466 kg/PS
 : 2.9 seconds
 Top speed:

References 

F50 GT
Sports racing cars
Rear mid-engine, rear-wheel-drive vehicles